The Government Island Historic District is a historic district on Border Street in Cohasset, Massachusetts.  It was for many years the land station associated with the Minot's Ledge Light.  Due to the difficulties associated with the construction of the light, its tower was actually assembled first on this site; the foundation area used for this purpose is marked in the small park.  The district also includes the original lightkeeper's house.

The district was added to the National Register of Historic Places in 1994.

See also
National Register of Historic Places listings in Norfolk County, Massachusetts

References

Historic districts in Norfolk County, Massachusetts
Cohasset, Massachusetts
National Register of Historic Places in Norfolk County, Massachusetts
Historic districts on the National Register of Historic Places in Massachusetts